Rosemount Halt railway station served the suburb of Rosemount, Perth and Kinross, Scotland, from 1857 to 1955 on the Scottish Midland Junction Railway.

History 
The station opened as Rosemount in September 1857 by the Scottish Midland Junction Railway. It was situated south of a level crossing and it had a timber waiting room. The station's name was changed to Rosemount Halt in 1938. It closed on 10 January 1955.

References

External links 

Disused railway stations in Perth and Kinross
Railway stations in Great Britain opened in 1857
Railway stations in Great Britain closed in 1955
1857 establishments in Scotland
1955 disestablishments in Scotland